Patrick Bowes-Lyon (5 March 1863 – 5 October 1946) was a British tennis player, barrister and uncle of Elizabeth Bowes-Lyon, mother of Queen Elizabeth II.

Career
He won the Scottish Championships in 1885, 1886 and 1888, he won the doubles at Wimbledon alongside Herbert Wilberforce. As a younger brother of Claude Bowes-Lyon, 14th Earl of Strathmore and Kinghorne, who was Elizabeth Bowes-Lyon's father, he was a great-uncle of Queen Elizabeth II and Herbert Bowes-Lyon who also played tennis.

He stood as the Conservative Party candidate for Barnard Castle.

Personal life
The fifth of seven sons and one of the eleven children of Claude Bowes-Lyon, 13th Earl of Strathmore and Kinghorne and of Frances Dora Smith, he married Alice Wiltshire, daughter of George Wiltshire, on 9 August 1893.

He and his wife Alice had four children:
 Lt. Gavin Patrick (13 December 1895 – 27 November 1917) – killed in action in World War I; never married, no issue
 Angus Patrick (22 October 1899 – 10 July 1923) – committed suicide; never married, no issue
 Jean Barbara (9 October 1904 – 7 January 1963) – never married, no issue
 Margaret Ann (14 June 1907 – 14 August 1999) – married 2 June 1945 Lt. Col. Francis Arthur Philip D'Abreu (1 October 1904 – 6 November 1995). Had one son and two daughters: Anthony Patrick John D'Abreu (born 17 March 1946), Francesca D'Abreu (born 7 February 1948), and Anne Teresa Alice D'Abreu (16 February 1950 – 17 April 1995).

Besides being a British tennis player, he was also known as Queen Elizabeth The Queen Mother's paternal uncle. He was a guest at her wedding to Prince Albert in 1923.

He died on 5 October 1946, aged 83. His widow died in 1953 at the age of 86.

Grand Slam finals

Doubles (1 title, 1 runner-up)

Notes

References 
The Plantagenet Roll of the Blood Royal: The Clarence Volume, Containing the Descendants of George, Duke of Clarence by (Melville Henry de Massue) Marquis of Ruvigny and Raineval, p 83, c) 1905.

1863 births
1946 deaths
19th-century English people
19th-century male tennis players
19th-century Scottish people
Patrick Bowes-Lyon
English people of Scottish descent
English male tennis players
People from Belgravia
People from Westerham
Wimbledon champions (pre-Open Era)
Younger sons of earls
Scottish male tennis players
Grand Slam (tennis) champions in men's doubles
Burials at Kensal Green Cemetery
Conservative Party (UK) parliamentary candidates
British sportsperson-politicians
British male tennis players
Tennis people from Greater London